Neoregelia magdalenae is a species of flowering plant in the genus Neoregelia. This species is endemic to Brazil.

Cultivars
 Neoregelia 'Crimson Sky'
 Neoregelia 'Crimson Sun'
 Neoregelia 'Cyclops Red'
 Neoregelia 'Nostradamus'
 Neoregelia 'Prophecy'
 Neoregelia 'Sophie'
 Neoregelia 'Star Of Brazil'

References

BSI Cultivar Registry Retrieved 11 October 2009

magdalenae
Flora of Brazil